The Scout and Guide movement in Brunei is served by two organisations
 Girl Guides Association of Brunei Darussalam, member of the World Association of Girl Guides and Girl Scouts
 Persekutuan Pengakap Negara Brunei Darussalam, member of the World Organization of the Scout Movement

See also